Lester Estelle, Jr. or Lester Estelle II (born April 28, 1981) is the drummer and backing vocalist for the Christian rock band Pillar.  He currently plays drums for singer-songwriter Kelly Clarkson and Jacob Whitesides.

Early life and first drumset 

Lester Estelle began to play drums at church and with his father and then began traveling in the eighth grade with the singer Troy Covey and band Seven. He started home schooling and traveling full-time during his second year.

He's played drums for several different bands, such as: The Edwardsville Strings, Nu Creation, Lynda Randle, Entry No. 5, and other various artists around the Kansas City area. Lester still does gigs with Trump Dawgs and DL Sully when he's not on the road.

Home life 
Lester married Lisa Byler in May 2002. When he's not on the road, he spends time with his wife Lisa and his son Jordan, daughters Kyra and Kelis and his dog Luna. He still makes time to help others with recording projects, advice, drum lessons and is sometimes available to play drums for a Sunday morning worship service.

Pillar 
In 2002, Lester auditioned and began playing for Pillar. He was replacing Brad Noone that left earlier that year. He has traveled all over the US with Pillar and visited several other countries. Lester has appeared on four Pillar albums Re-release of Fireproof(album) Where Do We Go From Here, The Reckoning and For the Love of the Game.  While the band was touring in support of The Reckoning, Lester began singing on the song "Tragedy" featured on the album and also begin singing on other songs as well. In 2008, Lester decided to leave Pillar in pursuit of other interests including his work with his new band, "Stars Go Dim" which Pillar's bassist, Michael Wittig and Pillar's former backup touring guitarist, Joey Avalos, were also part of; his departure affected Michael Wittig who also left Pillar.

Stars Go Dim 
Lester formed Stars Go Dim in 2007 with fellow Pillar Members Michael Wittig and Joey Avalos. Chris Cleveland is the group's lead Singer. Stars Go Dim is less metal based, unlike Pillar, and is more indie. Stars Go Dim released a self-titled EP in October 2008 and plan to release their debut record, Love Gone Mad, in August 2009.
Now composed of Chris Cleveland, Michael Cleveland, Kyle Williams and Josh Roach, the band recently signed to Fervent Records (Word Entertainment). Stars Go Dim announced their major label released, self-titled debut in October 2015. Their first single is "You Are Loved".

Kelly Clarkson
While trading gear with a friend, Estelle found out about the audition to be Kelly Clarkson's drummer. Lester was chosen to go on the road with Kelly and he toured with her in the summer of 2013. He has been playing with Clarkson since then, and he also plays in her house band on The Kelly Clarkson Show.

References

External links 
 Lester's website
 

1981 births
American performers of Christian music
African-American drummers
Living people
American heavy metal drummers
Pillar (band) members
21st-century American drummers